Kaghazi (also Romanized as Kāghaz̄ī) is a village in Somam Rural District, Rankuh District, Amlash County, Gilan Province, Iran. At the 2006 census, its population was 14, in 5 families.

References 

Populated places in Amlash County